Micrathetis is a genus of moths of the family Noctuidae. The genus was erected by George Hampson in 1908.

Species
 Micrathetis canifimbria (Walker, 1866)
 Micrathetis costiplaga (Smith, 1908)
 Micrathetis dasarada (Druce, 1898)
 Micrathetis tecnion Dyar, 1914
 Micrathetis triplex (Walker, 1857)

References

Condicinae